Joss Ambler (23 June 1900 – 1959) was an Australian-born British film and television actor. He usually played somewhat pompous and irascible figures of authority, particularly in comedy films. He was an effective foil to George Formby in both Trouble Brewing (as Lord Redhill) and Come On George! (as Sir Charles), and similarly to Will Hay in The Black Sheep of Whitehall, (as a government minister).

Filmography

References

External links

1900 births
1959 deaths
Australian male film actors
Australian male television actors
British male film actors
British male television actors
20th-century British male actors
20th-century Australian male actors
Australian emigrants to the United Kingdom
Date of death unknown